The 1993 San Jose State Spartans football team represented San Jose State University during the 1993 NCAA Division I-A football season as a member of the Big West Conference. The team was led by head coach John Ralston, in his first year as head coach at San Jose State. They played home games at Spartan Stadium in San Jose, California. The Spartans finished the 1993 season with a record of two wins and nine losses (2–9, 2–4 Big West).

Schedule

Team players in the NFL
No San Jose State Spartans were selected in the 1994 NFL Draft.

The following finished their college career in 1993, were not drafted, but played in the NFL.

Notes

References

San Jose State
San Jose State Spartans football seasons
San Jose State Spartans football